Thurning is a small dispersed village and civil parish in the English county of Norfolk and district of North Norfolk, near the border with Broadland. The population at the 2011 Census remained less than 100 and is recorded together with the neighbouring civil parish of Hindolveston.

Location and description
Thurning lies near Corpusty, seven miles (11 km) south of Holt, and nine miles (14 km) north-west of Aylsham.

The parish has no substantial settlements and consists chiefly of farms and houses which are well spaced from each other. It includes the small hamlet of Craymere Beck.

The soil is mixed, the subsoil clay and sand.

In his Topographical Dictionary of England (1848), Samuel Lewis says:

History
At the time of the Domesday Book (1086), Thurning was recorded as 'Tyrninga', i.e. "Tyrnings" (pl.), signifying "the place of the followers or kin-group of Tyrn", typical of the earlier, immigration phase of Angle-Saxon settlements. Charles Parkin translates its findings from the Latin: 

In 1659, Peter Elwin of Thurning (1623–1695) married Anne Rolfe, the elder daughter of Thomas Rolfe, who was the son of John Rolfe and his wife Pocahontas. John Rolfe was originally from Heacham in Norfolk, and his granddaughter Anne was brought up there.

Parish registers survive only from the early 18th century. Registers deposited in the Norfolk Record Office are for baptisms (1707, 1715–2006), marriages (1717–1739, 1758–2004), burials (1716–2006) and banns (1758–1822). However, some Archdeacons' and Bishops' transcripts survive, copies of register entries for years as far back as 1600.

According to William White, a good new rectory was built in 1827. Samuel Lewis calls this "a handsome house erected in 1832".

Following the Poor Law Amendment Act 1834, Thurning became part of the Aylsham Union. The first workhouses were at Oulton and Buxton, both closed when a new workhouse opened at Aylsham in 1849.

William White's History, Gazetteer, and Directory of Norfolk (1835 edition) says of Thurning: 

In 1835, there were twelve parliamentary electors for the West Norfolk division in respect of Thurning, of whom four were outside the parish: Thomas Armes of Weybourne, Hastings Elwin, Esq., of Thorpe, Caleb Elwin, clerk, of Melton Constable, and Robert Fountain Elwin, clerk, of Norwich. The eight at Thurning itself were Henry Wm Blake, clerk, Rash James Barber, James Gay, Esq., of Thurning Hall, Richard Hervey, James Margarson, John Pye, Daniel Sidney, and John Sewell.

In 1836, Thomas Frost was the licensee of a public house called 'The Plough'.

In 1839, the Rector was awarded a yearly rent-charge of £370, in lieu of tithes.

William White's History, Gazetteer, and Directory of Norfolk (second edition, 1845) says of Thurning: 

Benjamin Clarke's British Gazetteer (1852) says: 

In 1883, the chief crops were wheat, roots, barley and hay. Lieutenant-Colonel W. E. G. L. Bulwer was the lord of the manor. The principal residents were listed as Jas. Gay Esq. J.P., Thurning hall, Rev. John Fenwick, B.D., J.P., rector, Robert Brownsell, William Brownsell, Frederick Faircloth, Henry Hall, and Alfred Clark of Wood Dalling, farmers, George Burton, gamekeeper, William Harvey, farm bailiff, and Edwd. Poynton of Cray mere, blacksmith.

At the census of 1891, the following surnames are recorded in the parish: Adams, Aldis, Allen, Barnes, Baxter, Breeze, Brownell, Clitheroe, Cottrell, Cozens, Faircloth, Frances, Frost, Gay, Girling, Hall, Hardingham, Hazelwood, Hipkin, Howell, Hubbert, Keeler, Knowles, Ladell, Lease, Meadows, Partridge, Plane, Plattan, Poynton, Ray, Scarff, Sexton, Shave, Shuton, Southgate, Strutt, Twiddy, and Wright.

In 1900, the parish priest was the Rev. Robert Rust Meadows, while the parish clerk was Robert Ladell.

St Andrew's Parish Church
St Andrew's, Thurning, looks at first sight like a typical medieval church. Open every day, it stands alone, isolated from other buildings, on the Reepham Road and about a quarter of a mile north of The Rectory. Nearby is the former stable of the Rector, who sometimes lived at Wood Dalling. The church lacks a chancel, this having been demolished early in the 18th century. The east window has cross-linked tracery, clearly used to fill the arch of the lost chancel, and the east end of the north aisle has an unusual rectangular window.

In 1823, the church gained the furnishings of the old chapel of Corpus Christi College, Cambridge, when that was demolished. The aisle and the west end are filled with 18th-century box pews, and the interior is dominated by a huge three-deck pulpit at the east end of the church, designed by James Burrough. On each of the box pews, a sign gives the name of the property in the parish which paid rent for it. The middle of the church contains plain benches, the sanctuary has communion rails, and the south wall a line of hat pegs. Also on the south wall and in the sanctuary are several 18th century memorials.

About 1833, the building was thoroughly restored.

According to Kelly's Directory for 1883: 

Thurning now forms part of the Church of England 'Reepham and Wensum Valley Team of Churches' benefice, which also has churches at Reepham, Salle, Wood Dalling, Bylaugh, Elsing Lyng, Sparham, Swannington, Weston Longville, Attlebridge, Alderford and Great & Little Witchingham.

Thurning Hall
A large square three-storey Georgian building, it remains a private house but can be hired for weddings.

Shortly after the present house was built, it was advertised to let:

Kelly's Directory, 1883, says:

In 1996, the Hall was one of the locations for the filming of a BBC television version of George Eliot's The Mill on the Floss.

Mills
During the first quarter of the 19th century, Thurning Tower Windmill worked closely with Thurning Water-mill. From auction particulars of 1826, it appears that each mill powered two sets of stones. Bryant's map (1826) shows the windmill immediately to the north of the water-mill and marks them together as 'Union Mills', which infers that they worked together.

A notice for an auction at the Black Boys Inn, Aylsham, to be held on 14 August 1826 advertised the sale of "Lot 2. A Water Corn Mill & Wind Mill, lately erected on the most improved construction & containing four pairs of stones & two flour dressers, with stable, cowhouse & other outhouses &  or thereabouts of Arable land, meadow, wood & ozier ground adjoining. Also a Messuage & garden at a short distance from the Mill. The buildings & part of the lands in this Lot are in the occupation of William Reynolds, tenant from year to year & Possession of the remainder may be had at Michaelmas next."

In 1861, the notice of another auction to be held on 26 July 1861 advertised the sale of: "In BRISTON & THURNING Lot 2. A Messuage or Dwelling House with productive Garden adjoining, Watermill driving two pairs of stones, with large waterwheel in good repair & plentiful supply of water, Windmill, Cart Lodge, & other Outbuildings together with 30a. 1r. 19p. of Arable & Pasture LAND adjoining in the occupation of Chester Leman. This lot abuts upon Briston Common & land of James Gay, Esq. The Mills are capable of doing an extensive & lucrative business. Freehold."

References

External links

Thurning Church Website - Reepham Benefice
THURNING WAR MEMORIAL at roll-of-honour.com
Location map for Thurning at British-towns.net
Thurning Hall, at historicengland.org.uk
Photograph of St Andrew's Church, Thurning, at geograph.org.uk
Photographs of interior of Thurning Hall, at lightlocations.com
Photograph of Lake in front of Thurning Hall, near to Foundry Hill, at geograph.org.uk
Photograph of Reepham Road past Thurning Hall, at geograph.org.uk
THURNING CENSUS 1841 Surname Index at kingslynn-forums.co.uk

Villages in Norfolk
Civil parishes in Norfolk
North Norfolk